is a fictional character appearing in the role-playing video game Tokyo Afterschool Summoners, developed by Lifewonders, having been introduced in 2017. Within the game's narrative Horkeu is a Beast Descendant that resembles an anthropomorphic wolf and hails from the world of Kamui Kotan. A warrior, he seeks to find a human worthy of being called a hero to train them and become his master.

The character was designed by illustrator Gammachaos and is based on the deity of the same name, also spelled Horkew Kamuy, from Ainu mythology. Lifewonders has described the character as an "old-fashioned warrior". Outside of Tokyo Afterschool Summoners, Horkeu has also appeared as the central figure in Lifewonders' fitness app game Together With Horkeukamui, and Sengoku Puzzle!! Animal Daigassen. In print media, the character has also appeared in the self-published manga Upastum Kamui, created by Gammachaos and detailing Horkeu's life before the events of the game.

Since his creation, Horkeu has proven to be popular, with various forms of merchandise featuring the character, such as keychains and figures, having been created.

Development

Creation and name
Horkeu Kamui was designed by illustrator Gammachaos, and is based on the kamuy of the same name from Ainu mythology. In Ainu mythology, the now extinct Hokkaido wolf was worshipped as the deity Horkew Kamuy. In Ainu Shinyoshu, the Japanese transcriber and translator of Yukar Yukie Chiri, the deity's name was initially written as Horkeu Kamui, although newer editions instead use Horkew Kamuy, with the change having occurred by at least 1999. This caused some discrepancies in the English-speaking fandom of the game regarding the proper spelling of the character's name. According to Lifewonders, the older spelling of Horkeu Kamui is the correct one, as the character is "meant to be an old-fashioned warrior" and said spelling fits his character more.

Design and abilities
Within the game's narrative, the world that Horkeu hails from, Kamui Kotan has a very cold climate. Given Tokyo's hot weather, Horkeu prefers to wear few clothes. Horkeu's outfit consists primarily of a loincloth, which also contains a hole in the backside for his tail, and a hachimaki (Japanese headband), while occasionally wearing an unbuttoned jacket over his shoulders. Horkeu's fighting style predominantly consists of him using thrusts and kicks, while also being capable of using cryokinetic abilities to freeze his opponents.

Horkeu Kamui was originally voiced by actor Masato Yoshida, and is currently voiced by actor .

Appearances

Tokyo Afterschool Summoners
Within the game's lore, Horkeu Kamui is described as a divine wolf and warrior that hails from the dimension Kamui Kotan. A lover of the human race who teaches them his warrior lifestyle, he teleported to Tokyo and joined the Ikebukuro Berserkers in the hopes of finding a human who is a worthy hero and someone that he can call Master. While stern in his role as a teacher, he tends to be very amiable in his everyday life.

Other appearances
In April 2019, Lifewonders announced the release of their upcoming game titled Together With Horkeukamui. A fitness app to help users train their muscles, the game features Horkeu as the primary character and trainer. Masato Yoshida reprised his role from Tokyo Afterschool Summoners and recorded various lines lines of dialogue, relating to both training guides and users' names.

Horkeu Kamui also appears in Sengoku Puzzle!! Animal Daigassen, where he could be obtained during a collaboration event between the two games. Said event first took place in 2017, which lasted from October 3 to 31, and would be repeated in 2020, where Horkeu Kamui could be obtained between May 1 to 7.

The character's illustrator Gammachaos published on April 30, 2018 a bara manga titled Upastum Kamui. The manga focuses on Horkeu and details his story before the events of Tokyo Afterschool Summoners, including his relationship with Kimun Kamui.

Reception
A variety of merchandise of the character has bee created by both Lifewonders and other companies. These include acrylic stand figures, body pillows, blankets, or keychains. In January 2019, at the Japan Meeting of Furries, Lifewonders revealed two 30cm figures of the character to be sold.

References

Bibliography
 
 

Anthropomorphic canids
Anthropomorphic video game characters
Fantasy video game characters
Fictional characters with ice or cold abilities
Fictional demigods
Fictional bisexual males
Fictional gay males
Fictional martial artists in video games
LGBT characters in video games
Male characters in video games
Video game characters introduced in 2017
Video game characters who use magic